Brothers in Arms DS is a third-person shooter video game developed by Gameloft and published by Ubisoft for the Nintendo DS. It is part of the Brothers in Arms series established by Gearbox's Brothers in Arms: Road to Hill 30. In 2008, it was ported to the iOS as Brothers in Arms: Hour of Heroes by Gameloft and to the N-Gage QD as Brothers in Arms.

Overview

The player takes on the role of Corporal Barney Hill in the 101st Airborne Division, fighting in Tunisia, Normandy and the Ardennes during World War 2. The gameplay involves being either on foot, in a tank, or in a combat vehicle.

Reception

Brothers in Arms DS received "mixed or average" reviews, according to review aggregator Metacritic.

References

External links
 Official US site
 

2007 video games
Brothers in Arms (video game series)
Gearbox Software games
Multiplayer and single-player video games
Nintendo DS games
Nintendo DS-only games
Third-person shooters
Ubisoft games
Video games scored by Jake Kaufman
Video games developed in the United States
Video games set in France
Video games set in Germany
Video games set in Tunisia
World War II video games
Gameloft games